There are at least 35 named trails in Sanders County, Montana according to the U.S. Geological Survey, Board of Geographic Names.  A trail is defined as: "Route for passage from one point to another; does not include roads or highways (jeep trail, path, ski trail)."

 Bear Creek Trail, el.  
 Bear Paw Trail, el.  
 Berray Mountain Trail, el.  
 Black Peak Trail, el.  
 Cabinet Divide Trail, el.  
 Canyon Peak Trail, el.  
 Cataract Creek Trail, el.  
 Daisy Creek Trail, el.  
 Elk Mountain Trail, el.  
 Emma Peak Pack Trail, el.  
 Engle Lake Trail, el.  
 Engle Peak Trail, el.  
 Goat Peak Trail, el.  
 Goat Ridge Trail, el.  
 Green Mountain Trail, el.  
 Grouse Mountain Trail, el.  
 Huckleberry Mountain Trail, el.  
 Loveland Peak Trail, el.  
 Miller Creek Trail, el.  
 Moose Peak Trail, el.  
 Old Daly Trail, el.  
 Reader Gulch Pack Trail, el.  
 Revais Creek Trail, el.  
 Rice Draw Trail, el.  
 Slide Rock Mountain Trail, el.  
 State Line Trail (Montana), el.  
 Stevens Creek Trail, el.  
 Stevens Ridge Trail, el.  
 Thompson River Mount Headley Trail, el.  
 Twenty Odd Peak Trail, el.  
 Water Hill Trail, el.  
 West Fork Fishtrap Trail, el.  
 West Fork Trail, el.  
 White Pine Ridge Trail, el.  
 Windfall Peak Trail, el.

Further reading

See also
 List of trails of Montana
 Trails of Yellowstone National Park

Notes

Geography of Sanders County, Montana
 Sanders County
Transportation in Sanders County, Montana